The Eleventh Census of Bolivia is the most recent national census of Bolivia. It was conducted on 21 November 2012. The population was 10,027,254.

References 

2012 in Bolivia
Bolivia
Censuses in Bolivia